Jordan Township is an inactive township in Hickory County, in the U.S. state of Missouri.

Jordan Township takes its name from the community of Jordan, Missouri.

References

Townships in Missouri
Townships in Hickory County, Missouri